'Cosmic Ignition' is the fourth single to be produced by multi-instrumentalist/composer Tim Scott, first released on iTunes 20 July 2010.

The cover features a slightly controversial graffiti line drawing of a girls bum found scrawled on the side of a storm drain in San Antonio, Ibiza.

This single was recorded, mixed and produced  by Tim Scott at Acer Studios, Greater Manchester, mastered on 19 July 2010 by Geoff Pesche in Suite 5 at Abbey Road Studios, London.

Formats and track listings
Download single
"Cosmic Ignition (Radio Edit)" – 4:21
"Cosmic Ignition (Magic Foo Mix)" – 6:30

Personnel

 Tim Scott – Lead Guitar, rhythm guitar, bass guitar, Keyboard, drums, Drum Programming

Production

 Tim Scott – producer, engineer, mixing
 Ben Tyreman – mix assistant
 Geoff Pesche – mastering
 Laura Turner – artwork
 Tim Scott – photography

Release History

References

External links
CD Baby
iTunes

2010 singles
2010 songs